Zagam may refer to:
 Zagan (demon), a demon
 sparfloxacin, a drug
 Zəyəm Cırdaxan, Azerbaijan
 Zəyəm, Qakh, Azerbaijan 
 Zəyəm, Shamkir, Azerbaijan
 Zəyəm, Zaqatala, Azerbaijan
 Zagem, a former town in the Caucasus